Bloomfield Township is one of the seventeen townships of Logan County, Ohio, United States. As of the 2010 census the population was 430, making Bloomfield the smallest township in Logan County by  population.

Geography
Located in the western part of the county, it borders the following townships:
Stokes Township - north
Washington Township - east
Pleasant Township - south
Salem Township, Shelby County - southwest
Jackson Township, Shelby County - west

No municipalities are located within Bloomfield Township.

Name and history
Bloomfield Township was organized in 1832. Statewide, other Bloomfield Townships are located in Jackson and Trumbull counties.

Government

The township is governed by a three-member board of trustees, who are elected in November of odd-numbered years to a four-year term beginning on the following January 1. Two are elected in the year after the presidential election and one is elected in the year before it. There is also an elected township fiscal officer, who serves a four-year term beginning on April 1 of the year after the election, which is held in November of the year before the presidential election. Vacancies in the fiscal officership or on the board of trustees are filled by the remaining trustees.

In the elections of November 2007, Franklin Faulder defeated two other candidates in the election for the position of township trustee, while Laura Magoto was elected without opposition in the election for the position of township fiscal officer.

Transportation
State Route 274 passes through the northern part of Bloomfield Township.

References

External links
County website
County and township map of Ohio
Detailed Logan County map

Townships in Logan County, Ohio
Populated places established in 1832
1832 establishments in Ohio
Townships in Ohio